Lucas Galvão da Costa Souza (born 22 June 1991) is a Brazilian professional footballer who plays as a centre-back for Austrian Bundesliga club Austria Wien.

References

Brazilian footballers
Austrian Football Bundesliga players
1991 births
Living people
Associação Atlética Ponte Preta players
Esporte Clube XV de Novembro (Piracicaba) players
Red Bull Brasil players
Sociedade Esportiva e Recreativa Caxias do Sul players
SC Rheindorf Altach players
SC Austria Lustenau players
SK Rapid Wien players
FC Ingolstadt 04 players
Al-Wasl F.C. players
Atromitos F.C. players
FK Austria Wien players
UAE Pro League players
Brazilian expatriate footballers
Expatriate footballers in Austria
Brazilian expatriate sportspeople in Austria
Expatriate footballers in the United Arab Emirates
Brazilian expatriate sportspeople in the United Arab Emirates
2. Liga (Austria) players
Association football defenders
2. Bundesliga players
Expatriate footballers in Greece
People from São José do Rio Preto
Footballers from São Paulo (state)